This list of Aposphaeria species has been taken directly from MycoBank and currently contains a number of orthographic variants. Not all of these are accepted names: they are names that have been used.

 Aposphaeria abietis
 Aposphaeria acuta
 Aposphaeria agminalis
 Aposphaeria allantella
 Aposphaeria alpigena
 Aposphaeria alpiniae
 Aposphaeria amaranthi
 Aposphaeria amaranti
 Aposphaeria amelanchieris
 Aposphaeria anomala
 Aposphaeria arachidis
 Aposphaeria aranea
 Aposphaeria arctica
 Aposphaeria artemisiae
 Aposphaeria bambusae
 Aposphaeria bergii
 Aposphaeria berlesii
 Aposphaeria bicuspidata
 Aposphaeria bombacis
 Aposphaeria boudieri
 Aposphaeria brassicae
 Aposphaeria broomeana
 Aposphaeria broomeiana
 Aposphaeria brunaudiana
 Aposphaeria brunneotincta
 Aposphaeria buddleiae
 Aposphaeria buddlejae
 Aposphaeria calathiscus
 Aposphaeria calligoni
 Aposphaeria canavaliae
 Aposphaeria canavalliae
 Aposphaeria caraganae
 Aposphaeria caricae
 Aposphaeria caricicola
 Aposphaeria caulina
 Aposphaeria cava
 Aposphaeria cercidis
 Aposphaeria charticola
 Aposphaeria cinerea
 Aposphaeria citricola
 Aposphaeria citrispora
 Aposphaeria cladoniae
 Aposphaeria clematidea
 Aposphaeria clypeata
 Aposphaeria collabascens
 Aposphaeria collabens
 Aposphaeria complanata
 Aposphaeria compressa
 Aposphaeria condensata
 Aposphaeria conica
 Aposphaeria coniosporioides
 Aposphaeria consors
 Aposphaeria corallinolutea
 Aposphaeria cruenta
 Aposphaeria dendrophomoides
 Aposphaeria densiuscula
 Aposphaeria denudata
 Aposphaeria desertorum
 Aposphaeria difformis
 Aposphaeria elevata
 Aposphaeria elymi
 Aposphaeria ephedrae
 Aposphaeria epicorticalis
 Aposphaeria epileuca
 Aposphaeria eragrostidis
 Aposphaeria eurotiae
 Aposphaeria ferrum-equinum
 Aposphaeria fibricola
 Aposphaeria fibriseda
 Aposphaeria fibrisequa
 Aposphaeria fraxini
 Aposphaeria freticola
 Aposphaeria fugax
 Aposphaeria fuscidula
 Aposphaeria fuscomaculans
 Aposphaeria gallicola
 Aposphaeria glaziovii
 Aposphaeria glomerata
 Aposphaeria gregaria
 Aposphaeria halimodendri
 Aposphaeria haloxyli
 Aposphaeria hapalophragmii
 Aposphaeria hemisphaerica
 Aposphaeria henryana
 Aposphaeria herbicola
 Aposphaeria heveae
 Aposphaeria hippuridis
 Aposphaeria hospitae
 Aposphaeria humicola
 Aposphaeria hysterella
 Aposphaeria ilicis
 Aposphaeria iliensis
 Aposphaeria inconspicua
 Aposphaeria inophila
 Aposphaeria jubaeae
 Aposphaeria kansensis
 Aposphaeria kiefferiana
 Aposphaeria kravtzevii
 Aposphaeria labens
 Aposphaeria lampsanae
 Aposphaeria lapsanae
 Aposphaeria lentisci
 Aposphaeria leptospermi
 Aposphaeria leptosphaerioides
 Aposphaeria librincola
 Aposphaeria lignicola
 Aposphaeria longipes
 Aposphaeria macrosperma
 Aposphaeria major
 Aposphaeria majuscula
 Aposphaeria martinii
 Aposphaeria mediella
 Aposphaeria melaleuca
 Aposphaeria melaleucae
 Aposphaeria mesembryanthemi
 Aposphaeria minuta
 Aposphaeria minutula
 Aposphaeria mojunkumica
 Aposphaeria mollis
 Aposphaeria montbretiae
 Aposphaeria mori
 Aposphaeria mucifera
 Aposphaeria multiformis
 Aposphaeria musarum
 Aposphaeria nigra
 Aposphaeria nitens
 Aposphaeria nitidiuscula
 Aposphaeria nucicola
 Aposphaeria ohiensis
 Aposphaeria oxalidis
 Aposphaeria oxybaphi
 Aposphaeria oxystoma
 Aposphaeria pakistanica
 Aposphaeria papillula
 Aposphaeria parasitica
 Aposphaeria peregrina
 Aposphaeria petersii
 Aposphaeria pezizoides
 Aposphaeria phellodendri
 Aposphaeria pinea
 Aposphaeria pini-densiflorae
 Aposphaeria piperis
 Aposphaeria polonica
 Aposphaeria pomi
 Aposphaeria populea
 Aposphaeria populina
 Aposphaeria prillieuxiana
 Aposphaeria protea
 Aposphaeria pulchella
 Aposphaeria pulicaris
 Aposphaeria pulviscula
 Aposphaeria punicina
 Aposphaeria purpurascens
 Aposphaeria putamina
 Aposphaeria putaminum
 Aposphaeria quercina
 Aposphaeria radicata
 Aposphaeria ramalinae
 Aposphaeria reaumuriae
 Aposphaeria rhododendri
 Aposphaeria rhois
 Aposphaeria rostrata
 Aposphaeria rubefaciens
 Aposphaeria rudis
 Aposphaeria rugulosa
 Aposphaeria salicis
 Aposphaeria salicum
 Aposphaeria santolinae
 Aposphaeria schizothecioides
 Aposphaeria sepulta
 Aposphaeria sequoiae
 Aposphaeria seriata
 Aposphaeria silenes
 Aposphaeria sphaerospora
 Aposphaeria stenospora
 Aposphaeria stenostoma
 Aposphaeria stigmospora
 Aposphaeria striolata
 Aposphaeria subcorticalis
 Aposphaeria subcrustacea
 Aposphaeria suberina
 Aposphaeria subtilis
 Aposphaeria taquarae
 Aposphaeria tiliana
 Aposphaeria tragopogi
 Aposphaeria tragopogonis
 Aposphaeria trivialis
 Aposphaeria turmalis
 Aposphaeria ulei
 Aposphaeria ulmi
 Aposphaeria ulmicola
 Aposphaeria umbonata
 Aposphaeria villaresiae
 Aposphaeria violacea
 Aposphaeria zeae

References

Lists of fungal species
Melanommataceae